is a village located in Aso District, Kumamoto Prefecture, Japan. It is located on the northeast rim of the Aso caldera.

As of January 2021, the village has an estimated population of 1,438 and a population density of 24 persons per km2. The total area is 60.72 km2.

Local attractions include Ubuyama Farm, Ikeyama fountainhead, Higotai Flower Park, Ubuyama Farm Village, hot springs, Ubuyama Campgrounds and several restaurants. Known for its clean water and delicious food, Ubuyama's economy is mainly based on agriculture and tourism. Most restaurants and tourist attractions close early.

Education
Ubuyama is home to an elementary school, junior high and a preschool. There is no high school. In 2009 the number of students attending junior high school was 55. Ubuyama employs one native English instructor (Assistant Language Teacher) through the JET Program to aid in teaching English.

References

External links

Ubuyama official website 

Villages in Kumamoto Prefecture